Rui Machado was the defending champion but decided not to participate.
Victor Hănescu won the title, defeating Iñigo Cervantes Huegun 6–4, 7–5  in the final.

Seeds

Draw

Finals

Top half

Bottom half

References
 Main Draw
 Qualifying Draw

Pekao Szczecin Open - Singles
2012 Singles
2012 in Polish tennis